Razak (also Romanized as Rīzak and Rīzaq) is a village in Kharaqan-e Sharqi Rural District, Abgarm District, Avaj County, Qazvin Province, Iran. At the 2006 census, its population was 199, in 48 families.  
S

References 

Populated places in Avaj County